Saud Nasser Al-Saud Al-Sabah (3 October 1944 – 21 January 2012) was a Kuwaiti politician and diplomat.

Biography

Sabah was born on 3 October 1944. Sabah served as ambassador of Kuwait to Great Britain from 1975 to 1981. He then served as Kuwaiti ambassador to the United States during the First Gulf War, more specifically from 1981 to 1992. In 1992, he was appointed information minister and served in the post until March 1998. He was oil minister from March 1998 to 2000. He resigned from the post due to an explosion that killed five workers at the country's largest oil refinery.

He and his daughter Nayirah were reportedly involved in Citizens for a Free Kuwait, a front group established by the Kuwaiti government to promote US involvement in the Gulf War. This involvement was covered in the 1992 documentary film To Sell a War.

Sabah died of cancer on 21 January 2012.

See also
 Military of Kuwait

References

External links

1944 births
2012 deaths
House of Al-Sabah
Ambassadors of Kuwait to the United States
Ambassadors of Kuwait to the United Kingdom
Oil ministers of Kuwait
Deaths from cancer in Kuwait